The Promised Land is a 2015 Chinese drama film directed by He Ping. It was shown in the Platform section of the 2015 Toronto International Film Festival, where it received an honorable mention from the jury. The film was released on 27 October 2015.

Cast
 Jiajia Wang
 Yi Zhang
 Zhiwen Wang

Reception
The film has earned  at the Chinese box office.

References

External links
 

2015 films
2015 drama films
Chinese drama films
Films directed by He Ping
2010s Mandarin-language films